Serle is a surname, and may refer to:

Ambrose Serle (1742–1812), British diarist
John Serle (disambiguation)
Percival Serle, Australian biographer
Rebecca Serle, American writer
William Serle (1912–1992), Scottish ornithologist, physician, and minister

See also
Searle (surname)